Nuruzzaman Masum (born 12 March 1990) is a Bangladeshi cricketer. He made his first-class debut for Dhaka Division in the 2013–14 National Cricket League on 19 April 2014. He made his List A debut for Partex Sporting Club in the 2014–15 Dhaka Premier Division Cricket League on 11 November 2014.

References

External links
 

1990 births
Living people
Bangladeshi cricketers
Dhaka Division cricketers
Partex Sporting Club cricketers
Place of birth missing (living people)